Rhipidomys tribei, also known as the Tribe's climbing rat, is a species of rodent in the family Cricetidae. It is found in the state Minas Gerais of Brazil.

References

tribei
Mammals described in 2011
Mammals of Brazil